The Best of Suffocation is a best-of compilation album by the American death metal band Suffocation. It was released through Roadrunner Records on January 29, 2008.

Track listing

Tracks 1–5 were taken from Effigy of the Forgotten, 6–8 from Breeding the Spawn, and 9–12 from Pierced from Within.

References 
 [ The Best of Suffocation] at Allmusic

2008 greatest hits albums
Suffocation (band) albums
Roadrunner Records compilation albums